Lansdowne station may refer to:

 Lansdowne station (MBTA), a commuter rail station in Boston, Massachusetts, United States, formerly known as Yawkey station
 Lansdowne station (SEPTA), a SEPTA train station in Lansdowne, Pennsylvania, United States
 Lansdowne station (SkyTrain), a Metro Vancouver SkyTrain station in Richmond, British Columbia, Canada
 Lansdowne station (Toronto), a subway station in Toronto, Ontario, Canada
 Lansdowne Avenue station (SEPTA Routes 101 and 102), a SEPTA trolley stop in Upper Darby Township, Pennsylvania, United States
 Lansdowne Road railway station, an Irish Rail station in Dublin, Ireland
 Lancaster and Lansdowne station, a SEPTA trolley stop in Philadelphia, Pennsylvania, United States

See also
Lansdowne (disambiguation)